Channel 49 refers to several television stations:

INCTV 49 in Metro Manila Philippines

Canada
The following television stations broadcast on digital channel 49 (UHF frequencies covering 681.25-685.75 MHz) in Canada:
 CHEK-DT in Victoria, British Columbia
 CJNT-DT in Montreal, Quebec
 CKAL-DT in Calgary, Alberta

Mexico
The following television stations operate on virtual channel 49 in Mexico:
 XHDTV-TDT in Tecate, Baja California

See also
 Channel 49 TV stations in Mexico
 Channel 49 digital TV stations in the United States
 Channel 49 virtual TV stations in the United States
 Channel 49 low-power TV stations in the United States

49